The following is an incomplete discography for Anticon, an independent hip hop record label based in Los Angeles, California. Artists such as Sole, Buck 65, Odd Nosdam, Alias, and Jel have released records through Anticon.

Discography 
Combined discography of Anticon (cat. ABR) and subsidiary label 6months (cat. 6M). Singles are not included.

1998
 Anticon (VA) - Hip Hop Music for the Advanced Listener (#ABR0001)

1999
 Anticon (VA) - Music for the Advancement of Hip Hop (#ABR0002)
 Deep Puddle Dynamics - The Taste of Rain... Why Kneel? (#ABR0009)
 DJ Mayonnaise - 55 Stories (#ABR0005)

2000
 Themselves - Them (#ABR0010)
 Sole - Bottle of Humans (#ABR0011)

2001
 Sixtoo - Songs I Hate (And Other People's Moments) (#6M0001)
 Jel - Greenball (#6M0004)
 Restiform Bodies - Restiform Bodies (#6M0005)
 Anticon (VA) - Giga Single (#ABR0014)
 Why? / Odd Nosdam - The Why? & Odd Nosdam Split EP! (#ABR0017)
 Buck 65 - Man Overboard (#ABR0015)
 Controller 7 - Left Handed Straw (#6M0006)

2002
 Alias - Three Phase Irony Double EP (#6M0002)
 Deep Puddle Dynamics - We Ain't Fessin' (Double Quotes) (#ABR0019)
 Sage Francis - Personal Journals (#ABR0021)
 Alias - The Other Side of the Looking Glass (#ABR0022)
 Sole - Learning to Walk (#6M0003)
 Themselves - The No Music (#ABR0025)
 L'Roneous - Imaginarium (#6M0007)
 Josh Martinez - Rumble Pie (#6M0008)

2003
 Sole - Selling Live Water (#ABR0026)
 Sage Francis - The Makeshift Patriot EP (#ABR0027)
 Odd Nosdam - No More Wig for Ohio (#ABR0028)
 Why? - Oaklandazulasylum (#ABR0029)
 Alias - Eyes Closed EP (#ABR0033)
 Dosh - Dosh (#ABR0032)
 Themselves - The No Music of AIFFs (#ABR0034)
 Why? - The Early Whitney EP (#ABR0035)
 Alias - Muted (#ABR0036)
 Anticon / Beyond Space (VA) - Beyond Space Presents: Vol. 1 (#6Mxxxx)

2004
 Anticon (VA) - Anticon Label Sampler: 1999-2004 (#ABR0031)
 Josh Martinez - Buck Up Princess (#6Mxxxx)
 Odd Nosdam - Your American Bonus - Buy David Odd Nosdam (#ABR0040)
 Passage - The Forcefield Kids (#ABR0038)
 The Bomarr Monk - Surface Sincerity Soundtrack (#ABR0045)
 Dosh - Naoise EP (#ABR0042)
 Dosh - Pure Trash (#ABR0043)
 Telephone Jim Jesus - A Point Too Far to Astronaut (#ABR0046)

2005
 Pedestrian - Volume One: UnIndian Songs (#ABR0044)
 Sole - Live from Rome (#ABR0048)
 13 & God - 13 & God (#ABR0050)
 Why? - Sanddollars EP (#ABR0052)
 Odd Nosdam - Burner (#ABR0053)
 Alias & Ehren - Lillian (#ABR0054)
 Why? - Elephant Eyelash (#ABR0055)
 JD Walker - Them Get You... Them Got You (#6M007CD)

2006
 Why? - Rubber Traits (#ABR0061)
 Jel - Soft Money (#ABR0056)
 Alias & Tarsier - Brookland/Oaklyn (#ABR0059)
 Peeping Tom - Peeping Tom (#ABR0064)
 Darc Mind - Symptomatic of a Greater Ill (#ABR0063)
 Alias & Tarsier - Plane That Draws a White Line (#ABR0066)
 Dosh - The Lost Take (#ABR0067)

2007
 Bracken - We Know About the Need (#ABR0069)
 SJ Esau - Wrong Faced Cat Feed Collapse (#ABR0001)
 Bracken - Eno About the Need (#ABR0069B)
 Thee More Shallows - Book of Bad Breaks (#ABR0072)
 Alias - Collected Remixes (#ABR0071)
 Mansbestfriend - Poly.Sci.187 (#ABR0073)
 DJ Mayonnaise - Still Alive (#ABR0075)
 Odd Nosdam - Level Live Wires (#ABR0074)
 Telephone Jim Jesus - Anywhere Out of the Everything (#ABR0077)
 Sole and the Skyrider Band - Sole and the Skyrider Band (#ABR0078)
 Bracken - Remixes (#ABR0081)

2008
 Why? - The Hollows (#ABR0079)
 Son Lux - At War with Walls & Mazes (#ABR0082)
 Why? - Alopecia (#ABR0080)
 Dosh - Wolves and Wishes (#ABR0084)
 Odd Nosdam - Pretty Swell Explode (#ABR0083)
 SJ Esau - Small Vessel (#ABR0085)
 Alias - Resurgam (#ABR0087)
 Restiform Bodies - TV Loves You Back (#ABR0088)
 Tobacco - Fucked Up Friends (#ABR0089)
 Anathallo - Canopy Glow (#ABR0090)

2009
 Odd Nosdam - T.I.M.E. Soundtrack (#ABR0092)
 Themselves - The Free Houdini (#ABR0095)
 Bike for Three! - More Heart Than Brains (#ABR0093)
 Serengeti & Polyphonic - Terradactyl (#ABR0094)
 Why? - Eskimo Snow (#ABR0098)
 Themselves - CrownsDown (#ABR0096)

2010
 Son Lux - Weapons EP (#ABR0099)
 Josiah Wolf - Jet Lag (#ABR0100)
 Dosh - Tommy (#ABR0101)
 Tobacco - Maniac Meat (#ABR0103)
 Baths - Cerulean (#ABR0105)
 Themselves - CrownsDown & Company (#ABR0106)
 Saroos - See Me Not (#ABR0107)
 Tobacco - LA UTI (#ABR0109)
 Tobacco - Mystic Thickness (#ABR103CD)
 Tha Grimm Teachaz - There's a Situation on the Homefront (#ABR0110)

2011
 13 & God - Own Your Ghost (#ABR0104)
 Beans - End It All (#ABR0108)
 Serengeti - Family & Friends (#ABR0111)
 Antonionian - Antonionian (#ABR0112)
 Son Lux - We Are Rising (#ABR0114)
 Alias - Fever Dream (#ABR0115)
 Raleigh Moncrief - Watered Lawn (#ABR0117)

2012
 Serengeti - C.A.R. (#ABR0118)
 S/S/S - Beak & Claw (#ABR0119)
 Kenny Dennis - Kenny Dennis EP (#ABR0120)
 Doseone - G Is for Deep (#ABR0121)
 Isaiah Toothtaker - Sea Punk Funk (#ABRxxxx)
 Why? - Sod in the Seed (#ABR0126)
 Why? - Mumps, Etc. (#ABR0128)
 Bay Blue - Bay Blue (#ABR0125)

2013
 Young Fathers - Tape One (#ABR0132)
 D33J - Tide Songs (#ABR0130)
 Baths - Obsidian (#ABR0138)
 Young Fathers - Tape Two (#ABR0134)
 Serengeti - Kenny Dennis LP (#ABR0131)
 Jel - Late Pass (#ABR0137)
 Knifefight - Knifefight (#ABR0139)
 Daedelus - Drown Out (#ABR0140)
 D33J - Gravel (#ABR0136)
 Serengeti - C.A.B. (#ABR0123)

2014
 Young Fathers - Dead (#ABR0142)
 Alias - Indiiggo (#ABR0145)
 Baths - Ocean Death (#ABR0146)
 Alias - Pitch Black Prism'' (#ABR0143)

References 

Hip hop discographies